Gratkorn is a municipality in the district of Graz-Umgebung in the Austrian state of Styria. It is an  industrial suburb of Graz.

Population

References

Cities and towns in Graz-Umgebung District
Graz Highlands